Nový Jičín District is a district (okres) within Moravian-Silesian Region of the Czech Republic. Its capital is the town of Nový Jičín.

List of municipalities
Albrechtičky - Bartošovice - Bernartice nad Odrou - Bílov - Bílovec - Bítov - Bordovice - Bravantice - Frenštát pod Radhoštěm - Fulnek - Heřmanice u Oder - Heřmánky - Hladké Životice - Hodslavice - Hostašovice - Jakubčovice nad Odrou - Jeseník nad Odrou - Jistebník - Kateřinice - Kopřivnice - Kujavy - Kunín - Libhošť - Lichnov - Luboměř - Mankovice - Mořkov - Mošnov - Nový Jičín - Odry - Petřvald - Příbor - Pustějov - Rybí - Sedlnice - Šenov u Nového Jičína - Skotnice - Slatina - Spálov - Starý Jičín - Štramberk - Studénka - Suchdol nad Odrou - Tichá - Tísek - Trnávka - Trojanovice - Velké Albrechtice - Veřovice - Vražné - Vrchy - Závišice - Ženklava - Životice u Nového Jičína

See also 
Silesia Euroregion

References

 
Districts of the Czech Republic